The Australian Journal of Labour Law is a triannual peer-reviewed law journal that was established in 1968. It is published by LexisNexis in collaboration with the Centre For Employment and Labour Relations Law (Melbourne Law School). It covers Australian labour law. The editors-in-chief are Andrew Stewart (University of Adelaide law school), John Howe (University of Melbourne), and  Shae McCrystal (University of Sydney). Past editors include Anna Chapman (Melbourne Law School) and Rosemary Owens (University of Adelaide). The journal is abstracted and indexed in EBSCO databases.

References

External links

Publications established in 1968
Australian labour law
Australian law journals
1968 establishments in Australia